Vendler is a surname. Notable people with the surname include:

 Helen Vendler (born 1933), American critic of poetry
 Zeno Vendler (1921–2004), Hungarian-born philosopher